The Australian Football League's 1998 finals series began on Friday, 4 September 1998 and culminated with the 102nd AFL Grand Final at the Melbourne Cricket Ground on Saturday, 26 September 1998. Eight of the league's sixteen teams qualified for the finals based on the home-and-away season, and the finals were played under the McIntyre final eight system.

The series concluded with the grand final, which saw the Adelaide Crows (5th placed after the home-and-away season, 13–9) win its second consecutive premiership, defeating minor premiers North Melbourne (16–6) by 35 points. Adelaide was the lowest placed team after the home-and-away season to win the premiership since 1900.

Final Ladder

Week One

Qualifying Finals

|- style="background:#ccf;"
| Home team
| Score
| Away team
| Score
| Venue
| Attendance
| Date
|- style="background:#fff;"
| North Melbourne
| 11.16 (82)
| Essendon
| 8.12 (60)
| MCG
| 71,154
| Friday, 4 September
|- style="background:#fff;"
| Melbourne
| 17.13 (115)
| Adelaide
| 9.13 (67)
| MCG
| 60,817
| Saturday, 5 September
|- style="background:#fff;"
| Sydney
| 12.17 (89)
| St Kilda
| 13.9 (87)
| SCG
| 36,076
| Saturday, 5 September
|- style="background:#fff;"
| Western Bulldogs
| 18.13 (121)
| West Coast
| 7.9 (51)
| MCG
| 43,025
| Sunday, 6 September

Week Two

Semi finals

|- style="background:#ccf;"
| Home team
| Score
| Away team
| Score
| Venue
| Attendance
| Date
|- style="background:#fff;"
| Melbourne
| 15.17 (107)
| St Kilda
| 7.14 (56)
| MCG
| 88,456
| Saturday, 12 September
|- style="background:#fff;"
| Sydney
| 10.7 (67)
| Adelaide
| 14.10 (94)
| SCG
| 37,498
| Saturday, 12 September

Week Three

Preliminary Finals

|- style="background:#ccf;"
| Home team
| Score
| Away team
| Score
| Venue
| Attendance
| Date
|- style="background:#fff;"
| North Melbourne
| 17.12 (114)
| Melbourne
| 12.12 (84)
| MCG
| 73,719
| Friday, 18 September
|- style="background:#fff;"
| Western Bulldogs
| 13.15 (93)
| Adelaide
| 24.17 (161)
| MCG
| 67,557
| Saturday, 19 September

North Melbourne won its eleventh consecutive match. Adelaide defeated the Western Bulldogs in a preliminary final for the second consecutive year.

Grand final

References

External links
 AFL official website

AFL Finals Series
1998 Australian Football League season